
This is a list of the 41 players who earned 1999 PGA Tour cards through the PGA Tour Qualifying Tournament in 1998.

 PGA Tour rookie in 1999

1999 Results

*PGA Tour rookie in 1999
T = Tied
 The player retained his PGA Tour card for 2000 (finished inside the top 125, excluding non-members)
 The player did not retain his PGA Tour card for 2000, but retained conditional status (finished between 126 and 150, excluding non-members)
 The player did not retain his PGA Tour card for 2000 (finished outside the top 150)

Winners on the PGA Tour in 1999

Runners-up on the PGA Tour in 1999

See also
1998 Nike Tour graduates

References

PGA Tour Qualifying School
PGA Tour Qualifying School Graduates
PGA Tour Qualifying School Graduates